Charles Lynch may refer to:

 Charles Lynch (judge) (1736–1796), Virginia militia officer, probable source of term "lynch law"
 Charles Lynch (politician) (1783–1853), Governor of Mississippi
 Charles Francis Lynch (1884–1942), American judge
 Charlie Lynch (1891–1968), Australian rugby league coach
 Charles Lynch (pianist) (1906–1984), Irish pianist
 Charles Lynch (journalist) (1919–1994), Canadian journalist
 Charles C. Lynch (born 1962), former owner of a Morro Bay, California medical marijuana dispensary
 Charles F. Lynch, cancer researcher, professor at the University of Iowa
 Charles Dalton Lynch, architect

See also 
 Charles Lynch Award, Canadian journalism award